Rosa Palomino Chahuareses was an Aymara Indigenous leader, journalist, human rights activist, and social leader in Peru. In 2014, the Ministry of Culture presented her with an award for her work in developing community radio for women.

Biography 
Palomino was born in the rural community of Camacani, Puno, Peru. In 1985, in the Puno district of Huacullani, she and a group of women started the Aymara language radio show “Q´ana Panqara” (Bright flower). She is considered the first Aymara woman who has worked in radio hosting and production.

Since 1988 Palomino produces the radio show Wiñay Panqara (Always flourishing) at Pachamama Radio station, a cultural show that covers Aymara women's issues. Palomino was the director of Peru's Network of Indigenous Media Communicators. In 2019, she was a candidate for Congress of the Republic of Peru with the party Democracia Directa.

Palomino is the president of Abya Yala Union of Aymara Women (UMA, in Spanish).

In 2016, Palomino was recognized by Peru's Ministry of Culture as a renowned Indigenous woman leader. Due her leadership in Indigenous issues, Palomino has been invited to the United Nations and universities across the globe to talk about her community work. Palomino passed away in 2022.

References

External links
 Union de Mujeres Aymaras del Abya Yala Servindi Noticias, 2018.

Indigenous feminism
Indigenous rights activists
Year of birth missing (living people)
People from Puno Region
Peruvian women activists
Peruvian human rights activists
Women human rights activists
Aymara people
Social leaders